Reginald Owen Warner (1 March 1931 – 1996) was an English professional footballer who played in the Football League for Leicester City and Mansfield Town.

References

1931 births
1996 deaths
English footballers
Association football defenders
English Football League players
Leicester City F.C. players
Mansfield Town F.C. players
Hinckley Athletic F.C. players